Quack is the debut studio album by American–Canadian DJ duo Duck Sauce. It was released on April 14, 2014, by Fool's Gold Records.

Track listing
Adapted from iTunes and Qobuz.

Notes
  signifies additional producer
  signifies is a co-producer

Charts

Release history

References

2014 debut albums
Fool's Gold Records albums